Leon Lyons (born 2 December 1998) is a South African professional  rugby union player for the  in Super Rugby and  in the Rugby Challenge. His regular position is prop.

He signed for the Stormers Super Rugby side for the 2020 Super Rugby season.

References

South African rugby union players
Living people
1998 births
Rugby union props
Stormers players
Western Province (rugby union) players
Border Bulldogs players
Rugby union players from East London, Eastern Cape